Seventh Avenue Express is the name of the following subway services in New York City:
Seventh Avenue Express-Lenox (3)
Seventh Avenue Express-White Plains Road (2)
Broadway-Seventh Avenue Express, former service between Van Cortlandt Park and Brooklyn